Portrait of Madame Cézanne may refer to:

 Portrait of Madame Cézanne (Barnes Foundation) — painting by Paul Cézanne, 1885—1887 (now Barnes Foundation, Philadelphia, Pennsylvania)
Portrait of Madame Cézanne with Loosened Hair, Philadelphia Museum of Art
 One other of some 44 portraits Cezanne painted of his wife, Marie-Hortense Fiquet between 1869 and the 1890s
Portrait of Madame Cézanne (Roy Lichtenstein) a painting by Roy Lichtenstein, 1962, adapting the Barnes Cézanne